Trichococcus flocculiformis is a Gram-positive bacterium from the genus Trichococcus with a flagellum which has been isolated from sewage sludge from a sewage treatment plant from Echterdingen in Germany.

References

Lactobacillales
Bacteria described in 1984